The 1950 Western Illinois Leathernecks football team represented Western Illinois University as a member of the Interstate Intercollegiate Athletic Conference (IIAC) during the 1950 college football season. They were led by second-year head coach Vince DiFrancesca and played their home games at Hanson Field, which opened at the beginning of the season. The Leathernecks finished the season with a 7–1 record overall and a 4–1 record in conference play, placing second in the IIAC.

Schedule

References

Western Illinois
Western Illinois Leathernecks football seasons
Western Illinois Leathernecks football